How to Solve It (1945) is a small volume by mathematician George Pólya describing methods of problem solving.

Four principles 
How to Solve It suggests the following steps when solving a mathematical problem:
 First, you have to understand the problem.
 After understanding, make a plan.
 Carry out the plan.
 Look back on your work. How could it be better?

If this technique fails, Pólya advises:  "If you cannot solve the proposed problem, try to solve first some related problem. Could you imagine a more accessible related problem?"

First principle: Understand the problem 

"Understand the problem" is often neglected as being obvious and is not even mentioned in many mathematics classes. Yet students are often stymied in their efforts to solve it, simply because they don't understand it fully, or even in part. In order to remedy this oversight, Pólya taught teachers how to prompt each student with appropriate questions, depending on the situation, such as:

 What are you asked to find or show?
 Can you restate the problem in your own words?
 Can you think of a picture or a diagram that might help you understand the problem?
 Is there enough information to enable you to find a solution?
 Do you understand all the words used in stating the problem?
 Do you need to ask a question to get the answer?

The teacher is to select the question with the appropriate level of difficulty for each student to ascertain if each student understands at their own level, moving up or down the list to prompt each student, until each one can respond with something constructive.

Second principle: Devise a plan 

Pólya mentions that there are many reasonable ways to solve problems. The skill at choosing an appropriate strategy is best learned by solving many problems. You will find choosing a strategy increasingly easy. A partial list of strategies is included:

 Guess and check
 Make an orderly list
 Eliminate possibilities
 Use symmetry
 Consider special cases
 Use direct reasoning
 Solve an equation

Also suggested:

 Look for a pattern
 Draw a picture
 Solve a simpler problem
 Use a model
 Work backward
 Use a formula
 Be creative
 Applying these rules to devise a plan takes your own skill and judgement.
Polya lays a big emphasis on the teachers' behavior. A teacher should support students with devising their own plan with a question method that goes from the most general questions to more particular questions, with the goal that the last step to having a plan is made by the student. He maintains that just showing students a plan, no matter how good it is, does not help them.

Third principle: Carry out the plan 

This step is usually easier than devising the plan. In general, all you need is care and patience, given that you have the necessary skills. Persist with the plan that you have chosen. If it continues not to work, discard it and choose another. Don't be misled; this is how mathematics is done, even by professionals.

Fourth principle: Review/extend 

Pólya mentions that much can be gained by taking the time to reflect and look back at what you have done, what worked and what did not, and with thinking about other problems where this could be useful. Doing this will enable you to predict what strategy to use to solve future problems, if these relate to the original problem.

Heuristics 
The book contains a dictionary-style set of heuristics, many of which have to do with generating a more accessible problem. For example:

Influence 
 The book has been translated into several languages and has sold over a million copies, and has been continuously in print since its first publication.
 Marvin Minsky said in his paper Steps Toward Artificial Intelligence that "everyone should know the work of George Pólya on how to solve problems."
 Pólya's book has had a large influence on mathematics textbooks as evidenced by the bibliographies for mathematics education.
 Russian inventor Genrich Altshuller developed an elaborate set of methods for problem solving known as TRIZ, which in many aspects reproduces or parallels Pólya's work.
 How to Solve it by Computer is a computer science book by R. G. Dromey. It was inspired by Pólya's work.

See also 
 Heuristic
 How to Solve it by Computer
 Inventor's paradox

Notes

References

External links 

More information on Pólya can be found here.
Softpanorama page about the value of the book in programming

1945 non-fiction books
Heuristics
Mathematics books
Mathematics education
Problem solving
Princeton University Press books
Self-help books